Dundee United Football Club Women is a Scottish women's association football club based in Dundee that is affiliated with the professional men's club Dundee United F.C. Founded in 2015, they play in Scottish Women's Premier League 1, the first tier of the national league system, after winning promotion from the second tier in 2021–22 and third tier in 2018. They had previously been promoted from the fourth tier in their 2016 debut season. United came under the auspices of the senior men’s club in May 2022, changing their name from Dundee United Women’s Football Club to Dundee United Football Club Women.

History
Scottish Premiership club Dundee United announced in April 2015 that they were going to launch a women's team to compete in the Scottish Women's Football League (SWFL) from the following year. Club co-owner and director Justine Mitchell was instrumental in the decision. There were over fifty applicants for the position of head coach, none of whom were women. Gavin Beith was appointed as the team's first head coach in June 2015, with player trials commencing later that month. Ahead of the 2016 season, Fiona Mearns was chosen as the team captain.

United played their first competitive match on 6 March 2016, a 5–0 win over Dunfermline Athletic Development in SWFL Division 2 East at Gussie Park in Dundee. The same teams met again in June to contest the SWFL Division 2 Cup final. United lifted their first trophy with a 9–0 win, having led 7–0 at half time. The league title was secured with a 6–0 win over Edinburgh Caledonia on 9 October 2016. The club ended their first season having won all 16 league matches with a goal difference of +134.

In October 2018, Dundee United secured the SWFL Division 1 North title with a 7–2 win over Cove Rangers. United finished top of the league by a four-point margin, winning promotion to the second tier of the national Scottish Women's Premier League (SWPL) for the 2019 season.

Colours and badge
Dundee United wear similar colours to the men's team, with tangerine shirts and black shorts. Change colours are white and black. The club uses the same badge as the men's team.

Stadium

The team initially played their home matches at Gussie Park (then known as the GA Engineering Arena due to sponsorship), situated opposite Dundee United's Tannadice Park stadium. The match against Cove Rangers that clinched the SWFL Division 1 North title on 21 October 2018 was played on Tannadice itself, with an attendance of over 400. Between 2020 and 2022, the team mainly played at the Regional Performance Centre at Caird Park. They have also used the Dundee International Sports Centre on occasion. Following the completion of the first phase of redevelopment work on the Gussie Park facilities, it will once again be the team's regular from 2022 onwards.

Squad

On loan

Managers
Gavin Beith (2015–2021)
Graeme Hart (2021–present)

Coaching Staff
 Head coach: Graeme Hart
 Assistant coaches: Duncan Donald and Drew Myles

Honours

 Scottish Women's Premier League 2
 Winners (1): 2021–22
 SWFL First Division (North)
 Winners (1): 2018
 SWFL Division 2 East
 Winners (1): 2017
 SWFL Division 2 Cup:
 Winners (1): 2016

References

External links

Women's football clubs in Scotland
Dundee United F.C.
Football clubs in Dundee
Association football clubs established in 2015
2015 establishments in Scotland
Scottish Women's Football League clubs
Scottish Women's Premier League clubs